The Kataeb Party, also known in English as the Phalanges, is a Christian political party in Lebanon. The party played a major role in the Lebanese Civil War (1975–1990). In decline in the late 1980s and 1990s, the party slowly re-emerged in the early 2000s and is currently part of the March 14 Alliance. The party currently holds 4 out of the 128 seats in the Lebanese Parliament.

Names
Kataeb is the plural of Katiba which is a translation into Arabic of the Greek word phalanx ("battalion") which is also the origin of the Spanish term Falange. In 2021, the party changed its official name to "The Kataeb Party – Lebanese Social Democratic Party" (Hiẓb al-Katā'ib al-Lubnāniyya – Hiẓb al-dīmūqrāṭī al-ijtimāʿī al-lubnānī).

Origins
The Kataeb party was established on November 5, 1936 as a Maronite paramilitary youth organization by Pierre Gemayel who modeled the party after Spanish Falange and Italian Fascist parties he had observed as an Olympic athlete during the 1936 Summer Olympics held in Berlin, then Nazi Germany. The movement's uniforms originally included brown shirts and members used the Roman salute.

In an interview by Robert Fisk, Gemayel stated about the Berlin Olympics:

I was the captain of the Lebanese football team and the president of the Lebanese Football federation. We went to the Olympic Games of 1936 in Berlin. And I saw then this discipline and order. And I said to myself: "Why can't we do the same thing in Lebanon?" So when we came back to Lebanon, we created this youth movement. When I was in Berlin then, Nazism did not have the reputation which it has now. Nazism? In every system in the world, you can find something good. But Nazism was not Nazism at all. The word came afterwards. In their system, I saw discipline. And we in the Middle East, we need discipline more than anything else.

He founded the party along with four other young Lebanese: Charles Helou (who later became a President of Lebanon), Chafic Nassif, Emile Yared and Georges Naccache. Gemayel was chosen to lead the organization, in part because he was not a political figure at that time.

During the first years of the Kataeb Party, the Party was strongly opposed to having anyone dominate Lebanon. They opposed the pan-Arabists who tried to take over Lebanon and also the French, whom they saw as trying to infiltrate their culture and impose themselves within Lebanon. Gemayel and the Kataeb Party have always believed in an independent and sovereign Lebanon free of all foreign influence. It actively took part in the struggle against the French Mandate, until Lebanese independence was proclaimed in November 1943. Its motto was "God, Nation and Family."

The influence of the Phalangists was very limited in the early years of Lebanon's independence, but came to prominence as a strong ally of the government in the 1958 crisis. In the aftermath of the crisis, Gemayel was appointed to the cabinet, and two years later, was elected to the National Assembly.

In 1968, the party joined the Helf Alliance formed with the two other big mainly Christian parties in Lebanon: the National Liberal Party of former President Camille Chamoun, and National Bloc of Raymond Eddé, and won 9 seats (of 99) in the parliamentary elections held that year, making it one of the largest groupings in Lebanon's notoriously fractured political system. By the end of the decade, the party created its own militia, the Kataeb Regulatory Forces (KRF) and soon clashes began with the rising Palestinian militant guerrillas.

By the 1970s, the party had become a political giant in Lebanon, with an estimated membership of 60,000 to 70,000. The vast majority (85%) of members were Maronites, but some were members of minority Christian communities, Shiites, Druze, and Jews.

Ideology
 The primacy of preserving the Lebanese nation, but with a "Phoenician" identity, distinct from its Arab neighbors. Party policies have been uniformly anticommunist  and have allowed no place for pan-Arab ideals.
 A nationalistic ideology that considers the Lebanese people to be a unique nation independent from the Arab nation. It considers Lebanese as a Phoenician people.
 Independent, sovereign and pluralistic Lebanon that safeguards basic human rights and fundamental freedoms for all its constituents.
 Lebanon as a liberal outlet where Eastern Christianity, particularly Eastern Catholicism, can socially, politically, and economically flourish at peace with its surroundings.

Kataeb Regulatory Forces

The Phalange party's militia was not only the largest and best organized political paramilitary force in Lebanon but also the oldest. It was founded in 1937 as the "Militants' organization" by the President of the Party Pierre Gemayel and William Hawi, a Lebanese-American glass industrialist, who led them during the 1958 civil war. Fighting alongside the pro-government forces, the Phalangists defended the Metn region.

Disbanded in January 1961 by order of the Kataeb Party' Political Bureau, Hawi created in their place the Kataeb Regulatory Forces. In order to coordinate the activities of all Phalange paramilitary forces, the Political Bureau set up the Kataeb War Council (Arabic: Majliss al-Harbi) in 1970, with William Hawi being appointed as head. The seat of the Council was allocated at the Kataeb Party's Headquarters at the heart of Ashrafieh quarter in East Beirut and a quiet expansion of KRF units followed suit, complemented by the development of a training infrastructure.

Two company-sized Special Forces units, the "1st Commando" and the "2nd Commando" were created in 1963, soon followed by the "Pierre Gemayel" squad (later a company) and a VIP protection squad. To this was added in 1973 another commando platoon (Arabic: Maghaweer) and a "Combat School" was secretly opened at Tabrieh, near Bsharri in the Keserwan District; another special unit, the "Bashir Gemayel brigade" – named after Pierre Gemayel's youngest son, Bashir – was formed in the following year, absorbing the old "PG" company in the process.

Considered by many analysts as the best organized of all militia "fiefs" in the whole of Lebanon under the leadership of "chef" Boutros Khawand, it was administered by a network of Phalangist-controlled business corporations headed by the GAMMA Group "brain-trust", backed by the DELTA computer company, and the SONAPORT holding.  The latter had run since 1975 the legal commercial ports of Jounieh and Beirut, including the infamous clandestine "Dock Five" – "Cinquième basin" in French – from which the Phalange extracted additional revenues by levying illegal taxes and carried out arms-smuggling operations. The KRF was also served by a clandestine-built airstrip, the Pierre Gemayel International Airport, opened in 1976 at Hamat, north of Batroun, and had its own radio station "The Voice of Lebanon" (Arabic: Iza'at Sawt Loubnan) or "La Voix du Liban" (VDL) in French set up in that same year.

In July–August of that same year, the Phalangists headed alongside its allies, the Army of Free Lebanon, Al-Tanzim, NLP Tigers Militia, Guardians of the Cedars (GoC), the Tyous Team of Commandos (TTC) and the Lebanese Youth Movement (LYM) in the sieges – and subsequent massacres – of Karantina, al-Masklah and Tel al-Zaatar Massacres at the Muslim-populated slum districts and adjacent Palestinian refugee camps of East Beirut, and at the town of Dbayeh in the Metn.

During the 1975–76 phase of the Lebanese Civil War, the Kataeb Regulatory Forces' own mobilization and street action skills allowed the Kataeb to become the primary and most fearsome fighting force in the Christian-conservative camp.

At Beirut and elsewhere, Phalange militia sections were heavily committed in several battles against Lebanese National Movement (LNM) leftist militias and suffered considerable casualties, notably at the Battle of the Hotels in October 1975 where they fought the al-Murabitoun and the Nasserite Correctionist Movement (NCM), and later at the 'Spring Offensive' held against Mount Lebanon in March 1976.

Main events

1936–1943
In 1943, the Kataeb played an instrumental role in attaining Lebanon's first independence from the French mandate. During this period, Kataeb led many social struggles to consolidate national cohesion and to promote individual liberties and social welfare. The Kataeb elaborated the first Lebanese "labour charter" in 1937. It was a pioneer initiative as it called for a minimum wage, a limitation of working hours and paid leaves. The Kataeb was one of the first Lebanese parties to have a solid avant-garde economic program and organized social activism throughout the country. The year of 1941 saw the creation of the first women section in a Lebanese Party. It called openly for stopping any kind of discrimination towards women. Since 1939, the Party has issued Al Amal, a leading bilingual political publication.

1943–1958
The Kataeb Party entered the political and parliamentary scene during the late 1940s after a period in which it refrained from entering the political arena to focus mainly on the promotion of the youth and on social issues, away from the trivialities of post-mandate politics.

Kataeb struggled to preserve Lebanon's independence facing the growing appetite of its neighbors. The Party expanded considerably its presence throughout the territory and attracted thousands of new members, undoubtedly forming one of the largest parties in the Middle-East. Kataeb adopted a modern organization which made its fame and became its trademark. In 1958 the Kataeb was the key actor in confronting the coup influenced by pan-Arabists led by Gamal Abdel Nasser, President of the ephemeral United Arab Republic (Egypt, Syria and Yemen), and succeeded in maintaining Lebanon's independence and liberal identity.

1958–1969
After having succeeded in preserving the Lebanese formula, Kataeb Party ranks grew considerably and reached 70,000 members (of a total population of 2.2 million). The Party achieved many electoral successes and became the main Christian component of successive governments. During the ministerial mandates held by its members, it made elementary education mandatory and improved the public school infrastructure. On a social level, the Kataeb Party introduced "labor laws" and contributed decisively in social security law. The party played a key role in promoting modern institutions that are still today the pillars of the Lebanese administrative system. including the Civil Service Council, the Central Inspection Board and many others.

Pierre Gemayel, leader of the party and minister of public works, gave Lebanon a large part of its modern infrastructure by completing 440 development projects during his term. Lebanon was at its peak, and became a first-tier destination for world tourism. But what was labeled as the "Switzerland of the Middle-East" was a shaky construction, with the influx of Palestinian refugees after 1949 setting the stage for an ominous future.

1970–1982 

In the early 1970s, Christian leaders in Lebanon feared that the Palestinian Liberation Organization (PLO) was increasingly operating in Lebanon as a state within a state. While it is contested whether the Palestinian presence was a cause of the Lebanese Civil War, Lebanon's political balance had been fragile since 1958 and political tensions were already running high among the Lebanese. In 1975, following these developments, and coupled with the disintegration of the state institutions and the army, the country became an open battlefield.  Many foreign states were directly and militarily involved in the Lebanese conflict, especially Syria, which, under the banner of Arab solidarity, tried to impose its authority upon the country, and Israel, which invaded Lebanon in 1978. The Kataeb Party, along with other political parties, formed the Lebanese Forces and battled to preserve Lebanon and its independence and integrity. Driven by this ideal and the preservation of freedom and Christian dignity in the Middle East, more than 4000 members of the party died for this cause. The Kataeb Party succeeded in getting two of its leaders elected to the presidency. President-elect Bachir Gemayel, son of Pierre Gemayel and leader of the Lebanese Forces, was assassinated in 1982 when an explosion rocked the Party's headquarters in the Achrafieh area of Beirut. The architect of the blast was a member of the Syrian Social Nationalist Party. In the aftermath of the assassination, Amin Gemayel, the eldest son of Pierre Gemayel, was elected President of the Lebanese Republic.

The 1982 Israeli Judicial inquiry into the Sabra and Shatila massacre estimated that when fully mobilized, the Phalange had 5000 fighters, of whom 2000 were full-time. From the start of the invasion, Israeli Chief of Staff Rafael Eitan told the Phalange not to engage in any fighting.

1982–1988
Despite the turmoil caused by the civil strife in Lebanon and the raging wars that devastated the country, President Gemayel was able to accomplish many achievements during his presidential mandate. One of his first achievements was to rebuild the State's institutions and to reorganize and resupply the Army in preparation for the struggle to recover sovereignty and provide security for Lebanon.  The same efforts to liberate the country culminated in the Agreement on Security Arrangements of 17 May 1983, which was somewhat an affirmation of the Armistice Agreement of 1949 with Israel even though this agreement was never concluded because of the opposition of Syria and then Israel. Amin Gemayel called for and chaired national dialogue conferences in Geneva and Lausanne and succeeded in creating a national accord and the formation of a fully representative government. He also rebuilt the Lebanese University and laid its modern foundation, introduced many economic reforms and even started to rebuild Beirut central district. The war was however still raging and Lebanon's neighbors, mainly Syria and Israel, expanded their influence in the country. On the other hand, Kataeb Party suffered a great loss with the death of its founder, Cheikh Pierre Gemayel in 1984.

The Sabra and Shatila massacre was the slaughter of between 762 and 3,500 civilians, almost all Palestinians, by a Lebanese Christian militia in the Sabra and Shatila Palestinian refugee camps in Beirut, Lebanon from approximately 6:00 pm 16 September to 8:00 am 18 September 1982. The massacre was presented as retaliation for the assassination of the newly elected Lebanese president Bachir Gemayel, the leader of the Lebanese Kataeb Party. The Phalangist militia was led by intelligence chief Elie Hobeika. Many of the victims were tortured before they were killed. Women were raped and some victims were skinned alive. Others had limbs chopped off with axes.

1989–2000
In 1990, the Lebanese War came to a close when Syrian forces maintained their grip over the entire country leading to fifteen years of occupation during which President Amin Gemayel was exiled to France and the Kataeb Party fell under Syrian influence. Organized institutions that could endanger Syrian rule in Lebanon were systematically muzzled. Christian parties paid the highest price for their resistance to Syrian hegemony and their leaders were either eliminated, exiled or imprisoned. Kataeb spirit was however still strong between its members and sympathizers. This started to be visible in the late 1990s when Kataeb students participated actively in the student and intellectual resistance that started to be heard.

2000–2010

The revival of Lebanon and the Party: Amin Gemayel returned to Lebanon in June 2000 and was welcomed by large crowds that filled the streets and squares of Bikfaya. Pierre Amin Gemayel was elected MP for Metn district, signalling the rebirth of the Kataeb Party. "Kataeb opposition" was structured and began its activities within the framework of the "Kornet Shahwan Coalition", and then through the Bristol Gathering, which formed a platform for the joint Christian-Muslim opposition. Eventually, all this led to the Independence Uprising in February 2005 and on 14 March 2005 more than a million Lebanese filled the streets of central Beirut to demand Syrian withdrawal and the restoration of sovereignty. The Kataeb Party extensively participated in the Cedar Revolution and MP Pierre Gemayel played a significant role in shaping this uprising which led to Lebanon's second independence. Syrian troops effectively left Lebanon on 26 April of the same year, and at the same time, the Kataeb Party reunited and retrieved its historical role. Pierre Amin Gemayel played a key role in reuniting the Party in 2006. Pierre Gemayel was assassinated on 21 November 2006, and in 2007, the Party was dealt another blow when MP Antoine Ghanem was assassinated as well. During the 2009 general elections, under the leadership of Amine Gemayel, they managed to receive 5 seats in parliament.

2020–present 
In 2020, Kataeb Secretary-General Nazar Najarian was killed in the 2020 Beirut explosions on 4 August 2020, after a series of explosions had occurred at the Port of Beirut, sending debris across the city. He suffered head trauma and succumbed to his injuries. He was buried on 8 August 2020.

During the Lebanese general elections, candidates were announced on the 20 February 2022 under the campaign slogan Ma minsawim (ما منساوم ). Kataeb leader Samy Gemayel insisted that the Kataeb party was the only one that has "faced the fact of surrendering to Hezbollah's will, electing Michel Aoun as president and isolating Lebanon from its surroundings. Samy Gemayel emphasized:

On 2 April Nadim Gemayel, cousin of Samy, promoted his candidacy in a speech during a small event. Kataeb secured 4 seats for Salim Sayegh (3,477 votes), Nadim Gemayel (4,425 votes), Sami Gemayel (10,466 votes), and Elias Hankash (6,148 votes). A close ally of the party, Jean Talozian, also managed to wain a seat with 4,043 votes in Beirut I with Nadim.

Chronology of main events
 In 1943 the Kataeb played an instrumental role in attaining Lebanon's independence from the French mandate and co-designed the currently adopted Lebanese flag that was adopted by the Lebanese government of the time.
 In 1958 the Kataeb and its allies opposed the coup d'état by the United Arab Republic under the leadership of Gamal Abdel Nasser, and succeeded in maintaining Lebanon's independence and liberal identity.
 In 1969 the Kataeb opposed the Cairo Agreement, which legitimized military operations against Israel by Palestinian militiamen in South Lebanon; prompting many at the time to refer to the South as "Fateh Land."
 The conflict between the Kataeb and the Palestinian Liberation Organization (PLO) escalated in 1975 in the Ain ar-Rummaneh Bus Massacre carried out by Kataeb militants and regarded as the starting point of the Lebanese civil war.
 From 1978 until 1990, the Kataeb and the Lebanese Resistance clashed in fierce battles with Syrian Forces who were occupying large parts of the country resulting in an ongoing death toll among Kataeb members.
 In 1982 the leader of the Lebanese Resistance and president-elect Bachir Gemayel was assassinated when an explosion rocked the Kataeb headquarters in the Achrafieh area of Beirut. The architect of the blast was a member of the Syrian Social Nationalist Party. In the aftermath of the assassination, Amin Gemayel, current president of the party, was elected President of the Lebanese Republic.
 In 1990, the Lebanese War came to a close when Syrian Forces took control of the entire country, leading to fifteen years of occupation during which President Amin Gemayel was exiled to France and the Kataeb Party fell under Syrian control.
 In 2005, the Kataeb extensively participated in the Cedar Revolution, which saw a cross-communal revolt against Syrian occupation. MP Pierre Gemayel played a significant role in shaping this revolution which led to Lebanon's second independence.
 In 2006, the Kataeb Minister Pierre Gemayel was assassinated by opening fire his car at close range.
 In 2007, the Kataeb MP Antoine Ghanem was assassinated in a car bomb explosion in the Sin el-Fil area of North Metn.
 In 2020, Kataeb Secretary-General Nazar Najarian was killed in the 2020 Beirut explosions.

War era and decline

Throughout the 1975 Civil War, the Phalange Party was the most important force within the Christian camp, and its militia carried out most of the fighting as part of the Lebanese Front, the mostly Christian rightist coalition.

In April 1975, four persons, among them two men close to the Gemayel family, were killed during an attack on a church inauguration ceremony by unknown attackers in the Beirut suburb of Ain El Remmaneh. In retaliation Phalangist militias killed 28 passengers of a bus later that day, most of them Palestinian with some that were deemed to be armed that were coming back from a rally at camp Tel el-Zaatar, since they suspected Palestinians to be behind the church attack. The Bus Massacre is commonly considered as the spark that set off the Lebanese Civil War. In the following days, the 8,000-strong party militia, the Kataeb Regulatory Forces, together with its allies, the Tigers militia, Al-Tanzim, Marada Brigade, Guardians of the Cedars, Lebanese Youth Movement, Tyous Team of Commandos and other formations, was heavily engaged in street fights against the Palestinian militias and their allies in the anti-government secular Lebanese National Movement.

During the Lebanese Civil war, many predominantly Christian militias were formed who gained support from the north of Lebanon. These militias were staunchly right-wing, nationalist and anti-Palestinian with a majority of their members being Maronite. The Kataeb party was the most powerful of these militias at the time of the Lebanese Civil war. The party later went on to help found the right-wing Lebanese Forces militia in 1977 which played a large role within the Lebanese Civil war.

In September 1982, Bachir Gemayel was elected President of Lebanon by the National Assembly. He was assassinated less than a month later in an operation thought to have been arranged by Syrian intelligence and was in turn succeeded by his brother, Amine Gemayel. Bachir was thought to have been radical in his approach, and hinted at possible peace agreements with Israel while trying to expel all Palestinian refugees from Lebanon. In contrast, Amine was thought to have been much more moderate.

On 16 September 1982, Elie Hobeika led the massacre of between 762 and 3,500 Palestinian refugees in the Sabra and Shatila refugee camps, while the periphery of the camps were under the control of the Israeli Defense Forces.

After the death of Pierre Gemayel in 1984, his successors Elie Karamé and Amine Gemayel struggled to maintain influence over the actions of the Lebanese Army, which become virtually independent as Muslim recruits deserted and rebelled against the mostly Christian officer ranks. The Kataeb party began to decline, not playing a major role for the remainder of the war.

Syrian occupation
The party, lacking direction, broke down into several rival factions. Georges Saadeh took control of the Party from 1986 until his death in 1998. He took a moderate position toward the Syrian presence. Mounir Hajj became the president of the party in 1999, followed by Karim Pakradouni in 2002. Amine Gemayel left Lebanon in 1988 after his mandate had ended, mainly to avoid a clash with Samir Geagea's Lebanese Forces and avoid more Intra-Christian bloodshed. He returned in 2000 to oppose the Syrian role in Lebanon and to back his son's (Pierre) parliamentary election campaign (which he won). His sons Pierre and Samy, had returned in 1997 and had been working on reorganizing the popular base of the party. However his return was not welcome by the established leadership of the party who had become government puppets. To distinguish themselves from the official leadership, Gemayel's supporters started referring to themselves as "The Kataeb Base" or "The Kataeb Reform Movement". General consensus amongst Lebanese always recognized Gemayel as the legitimate Leader of the party, not because of lineage but because most of popular support.

Cedar Revolution
In March 2005 after the Rafik Hariri assassination, the Kataeb took part in an anti-Syrian presence demonstration, commonly known as the Cedar Revolution. It also became a member of the March 14 Alliance, along with the Future Movement, Progressive Socialist Party, Lebanese Forces and other minor parties. The Kataeb won 4 seats in the June 2005 elections, 3 representing the Gemayel Leadership (Pierre Gemayel, Solange Gemayel and Antoine Ghanem) and 1 representing the official leadership of the Party. However, they formed one parliamentary bloc after a reconciliation that took place in 2005. This reconciliation was marketed as gesture of good will from Pierre Amine Gemayel who deemed it was time to turn the page and give those who were unfaithful to the party principles a second chance. Practically, it was a way for Pakradouni and his men to leave the Party with as little humiliation as possible since the reconciliation deal stipulated the resignation of the entire political bureau after 2 years. This reconciliation saw Amine come back to the Party as Supreme President of the Party while Pakradouni stayed on as President. Samy Gemayel (Amine's second son) who had formed his own political ideas and identity at the time (much closer in principle and in manner to those of his uncle Bachir) was a very strong opposer of Pakradouni and his Syrian ties and thus was not a fan of this reconciliation. This drew Samy away from the party and prompted him to create a Think-Tank/Research-Center on Federalism named Loubnanouna (Our Lebanon).

Siniora Government
In July 2005, the party participated in the Fouad Siniora Government, with Pierre Amine Gemayel as the minister of industry. Pierre played an important role in the reorganization and development of the party. His assassination in November 2006 was a major blow to the party. Syrian intelligence and "Fateh Al Islam" have been accused of the assassination. With 14 March Alliance forces, the party supports the Lebanese government against Hezbollah.

In September 2007 another Kataeb MP, Antoine Ghanem was assassinated in a car bombing. Solange Gemayel remained the party's only MP, since Pierre Gemayel's seat was lost to the Free Patriotic Movement of Michel Aoun in a special election in August 2007.

In 2007 also, Samy Gemayel and (most of) his Loubnanouna companions rejoined the Kataeb, prompting a renaissance in the party.

2009 elections
In the 2009 parliamentary elections the Kataeb Party managed to win 5 seats. 1 in the Metn Caza, 1 in the Beirut-1 Caza, 1 in Zahle, 1 in the Aley Caza and another in the Tripoli Caza. The victories in Beirut-1 and Zahle as well as not allowing the opposition's list to win fully in Metn were major upsets to the General Aoun's FPM who is an ally of Iranian-backed Hezbollah, although the opposition's list was not 100% complete, leaving one Maronite seat vacant by purpose for the candidate of the Gemayel family. These victories enabled Samy Gemayel, Nadim Gemayel (son of the assassinated President Bachir Gemayel), Elie Marouni, Fady el-Haber and Samer Saade to join the Parliament.
In the first Government of PM Saad Hariri, the Kataeb were assigned the Social Affairs portfolio.

The Kataeb Party today
Since the end of Syria's occupation of Lebanon in 2005, the Kataeb Party has attracted once again new generations and has regained its role as one of the major political actors in Lebanon. The Party has a large network in Lebanon and abroad and one cannot find a major city or town without a Kataeb presence.

The Party has an active parliamentary group and has MPs elected in nearly all major Christian constituencies such as Beirut, Metn, Zahlé, Aley and the North. Moreover, Kataeb Ministers have been particularly active in governments led by 14 March coalition, namely in Ministries of Industry, Social Affairs and Tourism.

The Kataeb Party calls for an objective assessment of the Lebanese political system's limitations in order to guarantee the required political stability, security and economic prosperity. The series of political crises that Lebanon witnessed since its first independence in 1943 highlighted the shortcomings of the consensual and unitary system and its inadequacy with pluralistic countries such as Lebanon.

During the 2009 parliamentary elections that saw the victory of the Party and its allies, Kataeb presented a comprehensive program under the title of "Pact of Stability". The vision of the Party revolves around the following main ideas:

 Adopting decentralization in order to be closer to the citizen and guarantee basic rights and freedoms, in order to manage constructively Lebanon's cultural pluralism and to ensure development in all parts of the Lebanese territory.
 Proclaiming the neutrality of Lebanon towards all armed conflicts in the region in order to protect Lebanon from external meddling into its affairs, except for the Arab-Israeli conflict.
 Safeguarding the secular State in Lebanon and completing its legal framework to guarantee the freedom of the individual and the respect of his rights and integrity. 
 Ending the military status of several Lebanese and non-Lebanese groups such as Hezbollah, Palestinian armed militias and other Islamist groups, and call for their immediate disarmament.
 Committing to all relevant UN Security Council Resolutions, primarily 1559 (2004), 1680 (2006), 1701 (2006) and 1757 (2007).
 Rejecting any form of permanent settlement of Palestinian refugees in Lebanon at the expense of their right of return.
 Reforming the Lebanese Administration and adopting modern economic policies to stimulate the economy, ensure prosperity and therefore stop emigration.

The Party is also strongly concerned about the presence of Palestinian refugees with their regional and domestic ramifications. Notwithstanding that the Kataeb has recently attempted to improve the inhumane living conditions of refugees through Parliament, it remains concerned about latent or gradual attempts to force their permanent settlement in Lebanon.

On 11 March 2018, the Kataeb Party unveiled their 131-point platform, in which they expressed some progressive values such as decriminalizing homosexuality, abolishing capital punishment, removing censorship laws, and adopting a 30% female quota system in the parliament.

The secretary-general of the party, Nazar Najarian, was killed in the 2020 Port of Beirut explosions.

Recent elections 
Candidates were announced on the 20 February 2022 under the campaign slogan Ma minsawim (ما منساوم). Kataeb leader Samy Gemayel insisted that the Kataeb party was the only one that has faced the fact of surrendering to Hezbollah's will, electing Michel Aoun as president and isolating Lebanon from its surroundings. Samy Gemayel emphasized:On 2 April Nadim Gemayel, cousin of Samy, promoted his candidacy in a speech during a small event.

Kataeb secured 4 seats for Salim Sayegh (3,477 votes), Nadim Gemayel (4,425 votes), Sami Gemayel (10,466 votes), and Elias Hankash (6,148 votes).

Presidents of the Party 
 Pierre Gemayel (1936–1984)
 Elie Karameh (1984–1986)
 Georges Saadeh (1986–1998)
 Mounir El Hajj (1998–2001)
 Karim Pakradouni (2001–2007)
 Amine Gemayel (2007–2015)
 Samy Gemayel (2015–present)

Electoral performance

See also

 Cedar Revolution
 Ehden massacre
 William Hawi
 Kataeb Regulatory Forces
 Lebanese Forces (Resistance)
 Najjadeh Party
 Political parties in Lebanon
 SSNP
 Tyous Team of Commandos

Citations

General and cited sources 
 Denise Ammoun, Histoire du Liban contemporain: Tome 2, 1943–1990, Fayard, Paris 2005.  (in French).
 Rex Brynen, Sanctuary and Survival: the PLO in Lebanon, Boulder: Westview Press, 1990.
 Robert Fisk, Pity the Nation: Lebanon at War, London: Oxford University Press,  (3rd ed. 2001).
 Matthew S. Gordon, The Gemayels (World Leaders Past & Present), Chelsea House Publishers, 1988. 
 Michael Maschek, Myrtom House Building: Un quartier de Beyrouth en guerre civile, L'Harmattan, 2018.
 Jonathan Randal, The Tragedy of Lebanon, Just World Books, 1983.
 Jean Sarkis, Histoire de la guerre du Liban, Presses Universitaires de France – PUF, Paris 1993.  (in French).
 Fawwaz Traboulsi, Identités et solidarités croisées dans les conflits du Liban contemporain, Thèse de Doctorat d'Histoire – 1993, Université de Paris VIII, 2007 (in French).

Further reading
 Frank Stoakes, The Super vigilantes: the Lebanese Kata'eb Party as Builder, Surrogate, and Defender of the State, Middle East Studies 11, 3 (October 1975): 215236.
 John P. Entelis, Pluralism and party transformation in Lebanon: Al-Kata'ib, 1936–1970, E. J. Brill, Leiden 1974.
 Leila Haoui Zod, William Haoui, temoin et martyr, Mémoire DEA, Faculté d'Histoire, Université Saint Esprit, Kaslik, Liban 2004. (in French)
 Marie-Christine Aulas, The Socio-Ideological Development of the Maronite Community: The Emergenge of the Phalanges and Lebanese Forces, Arab Studies Quarterly 7, 4 (Fall 1985): pp. 1–27.

External links
 Official website of the Kataeb party
 Official website of The Lebanese Phalanges – Kataeb

 
1936 establishments in Mandatory Syria
Anti-communist parties
Centre-right parties in Asia
Christian democratic parties in Asia
Christian political parties in Lebanon
Conservative parties in Lebanon
Factions in the Lebanese Civil War
Falangist parties
Lebanese Front
Lebanese nationalist parties
March 14 Alliance
National conservative parties
Phoenicianism
Political parties established in 1936
Political parties in Lebanon
Right-wing parties
Social conservative parties